The purpose of the Oklahoma Native Plant Society, organized in 1986, is to encourage the study, protection, propagation, appreciation, and use of Oklahoma's native plants. It sponsors a number of activities including field trips, a spring wildflower workshop, and a wildflower photo contest. The society also publishes a quarterly newsletter, The Gaillardia, which keeps members informed of activities and contains stories and essays about wildflowers. In addition, the society sponsors Color Oklahoma, a project dedicated to the beautification of Oklahoma's highways via the planting of wildflowers and maintenance of naturally occurring wildflower populations in rights-of-way.

Invasive Plant Council
The Oklahoma Native Plant Society works with the Oklahoma Invasive Plant Council to educate the public about the harm caused by invasive plants in Oklahoma and to help control the spread of invasive plants in the state.

The Oklahoma Native Plant Record
Initiated in 2001, The Oklahoma Native Plant Record is the annual scientific publication of the Oklahoma Native Plant Society.

References

Non-profit organizations based in Oklahoma
Native plant societies based in the United States
Flora of Oklahoma